trans-3-Methyl-4-octanolide, also called trans-β-methyl-γ-octalactone is a chemical compound of the lactone family with formula .  It exists in two stereoisomers: (3R,4S) and (3S,4R).

The (3S,4R) form is found in whiskey and other alcoholic beverages that have been aged in oak barrels, together with the more important cis isomer. It has a coconut, celery or fresh wood aroma, that can be detected by humans at the concentration of 20 μg/L in air.  A mixture of the cis and trans isomers is repellent for mosquitos and flies.

The (3S,4R) isomer is extracted by the alcoholic beverage from some precursor substances in the oak wood.  It can be synthesized in various ways.

See also
 cis-3-Methyl-4-octanolide, the more important stereoisomer

References

Lactones